"Frozen Ones" is a single by the band Ultravox!. It was only released in West Germany.

It features two songs which appear on the band's second album Ha!-Ha!-Ha!. 
However whilst the A-side, "Frozen Ones", is identical to the album cut, the B-side "Man Who Dies Every Day" is a slightly different mix to the album version. This alternative mix was included as a bonus track on the remastered CD edition of Ha!-Ha!-Ha!, released in 2006.

Track listing
 A1: "Frozen Ones"
 B1: "Man Who Dies Every Day"

1977 singles
Ultravox songs
Song recordings produced by Steve Lillywhite
Songs written by John Foxx
1977 songs